Korhan Öztürk (born 28 June 1982) is a Turkish former football midfielder.

External links
Guardian Stats Centre

1982 births
Living people
People from Bornova
Turkish footballers
Turkey under-21 international footballers
Turkey youth international footballers
Antalyaspor footballers
Kasımpaşa S.K. footballers
Süper Lig players
Footballers from İzmir
Association football midfielders